The Puerto Rico men's national water polo team is the representative for Puerto Rico in international men's water polo.

Results

FINA World League
 2007 — Preliminary round

References

Water polo
Men's national water polo teams
National water polo teams in North America
National water polo teams by country
Men's sports in Puerto Rico